Long Island is an uninhabited island in Poole Harbour in the English county of Dorset. It lies just off the shore of the Arne Peninsular in the south-west of the harbour, and is separated from the nearby, and inhabited, Round Island by a narrow channel only a few feet wide. The island covers approximately 30 acres at low tide, reducing to only  at high tide. Long Island lies within the civil parish of Corfe Castle. The parish forms part of the Purbeck local government district.

Long Island had been privately owned by the Rempstone Estate for over 250 years but in 2007 it was closed to the public and put up for sale with offers invited in excess of £1 million. The sale was initially delayed by a rights of way application made by pleasure boat owners who feared the new landlords would deny public access to the island. However the application was dismissed by Dorset County Council in 2009 and the island was sold in 2010 for an estimated £3 million to a local property developer.

On 24 August 1943, a Royal Air Force Consolidated Catalina (FP287) was on a training flight & was landing at Poole Seaplane Base. The aircraft overshot the landing path during the second flare then attempted a go-ground, soon after crashed into sea next to the island. Eight of the Twelve crew died in the crash.

References

External links

Islands of Dorset
Uninhabited islands of England
Poole Harbour
Corfe Castle
Private islands of the United Kingdom
Aviation accidents and incidents locations in England